The women's synchronized 3 metre springboard diving competition at the 2010 Asian Games in Guangzhou was held on 22 November at the Aoti Aquatics Centre.

Schedule
All times are China Standard Time (UTC+08:00)

Results 
Legend
DNF — Did not finish
DNS — Did not start

References 

Results

External links
Results

Diving at the 2010 Asian Games